Heteralcis clavata is a moth in the family Lecithoceridae. It was described by Kyu-Tek Park in 2001. It is found in Sri Lanka.

The wingspan is 12.5–13.5 mm. There are four well-developed brown fascia on the forewings with the median and postmedian fascia connected medially. The hindwings are orange white.

Etymology
The species name refers to the shape of the distal part of the valva in the male genitalia.

References

Moths described in 2001
Heteralcis